"Tonight She Comes" is a 1985 song by American rock band the Cars from their Greatest Hits album. It was released as a single in October 1985, reaching number seven on the Billboard Hot 100 in January 1986. The song reached number one on the Top Rock Tracks chart, where it stayed for three weeks.

Background
"Tonight She Comes" was written by Cars singer and guitarist Ric Ocasek, who had originally intended to save the song for his solo career; however, the song was instead recorded as a standalone single. Ocasek recalled, "I was in the middle of recording my solo album and it was one of the songs I didn't use in the solo album at that point. That was like a one-off single that we just all came together and did."

Composition
It is a straightforward, diatonic song in F major, with a guitar solo by Cars guitarist Elliot Easton. The solo was transcribed by Steve Vai in the February 1986 issue of Guitar Player magazine as the centerpiece to an interview with Easton.

In the interview, Easton described the custom-made Kramer guitar used for the solo, and said the reason the solo was "so dense" was due to the four weeks spent recording the single, which allowed Easton ample time to compose it. The title of the song is yet another Ocasek double entendre, although as Easton said, "It doesn't actually say that she reaches orgasm. It could mean that tonight she's coming over to make popcorn."

Release and reception
"Tonight She Comes" was the Cars' fourth and last Top 10 hit. It was the first of two songs to be released as a single from their album of Greatest Hits. A remixed version of "I'm Not the One", previously recorded in 1981 for the album Shake It Up, was the second.

Cash Box said that the song "captures the group’s technologically astute and emotionally problematic songwriting perspective."  AllMusic critic Greg Prato, in his review of Greatest Hits, described the track as "playful", while Tim Sendra, also of AllMusic, said in his review of The Essentials that the track (among the others on said album), was "definitely essential".

Charts

Weekly charts

Year-end charts

References

1985 songs
1985 singles
1986 singles
The Cars songs
Song recordings produced by Ric Ocasek
Songs written by Ric Ocasek
Elektra Records singles